The Aal is a small river in the town of Aalen in Baden-Württemberg, Germany. It originates in the Dürrwiesen near the road bridge of the K 3326 at the western end of the street Gartenstraße through the confluence of the left Rombach and the right Sauerbach, that slightly exceeds the Rombach in length and area of basin. From here, the Aal first flows eastern, later northeastern direction. After 1.6 km, it flows on the left side of the Reichstädter Markt into the Kocher.

For the Ancient Romans, the Aal was the reason to erect the Aalen Castle somewhat north of it, its largest equestrian fort north of the Alps. They extracted up to 30,000 liters of water daily for their approximately 1,000 horses.

At the confluence of Rombach and Sauerbach, the Aal was recultivated for 5 million euros, and on September 10, 2010 the newly constructed Dürrwiesen flood retention basin was inaugurated.

Tributaries

Rombach, left headwater, 5.8 km from the mouth most distant source, and 12.1 km². 
It is considered as the main headwater, the name officially used also for the total course of the Aal.
Sauerbach right headwaters, 6.5 km  from muzzle most distant source and 12.9 km². 
Heuchelbach, from the right near the street Fackelbrückenstraße, 1.5 km and 1.1 km².

See also
List of rivers of Baden-Württemberg

Rivers of Baden-Württemberg
Rivers of Germany